The Union of Agricultural Workers and Employees was a trade union representing workers in the agricultural and forestry sectors in Yugoslavia.

The union was founded in April 1945 and affiliated to the Confederation of Trade Unions of Yugoslavia.  By 1954, it claimed 84,792 members, and was led by Emil Kevrešan.  In 1959, it merged with the Union of Food and Tobacco Workers, to form the Union of Agricultural, Food Processing and Tobacco Workers of Yugoslavia.

References

Agriculture and forestry trade unions
Trade unions established in 1945
Trade unions disestablished in 1959
Trade unions in Yugoslavia